The 2022 European Athletics Championships were the 25th edition of the European Athletics Championships and were held in Munich, Germany, from 15 to 21 August 2022.

They were part of the European Championships, a multi-sport tournament which brings together the existing European Championships of some of the continent's sports.

Germany headed the medal table on 7 gold medals, while Great Britain, second on gold medals won with 6, won the most overall medals, 20.

Event schedule

M = morning session, E = evening session
lins wako

Results

Men

Track

Field

Combined

Women

Track

Field

Combined

Medal table
After all 50 events.

Placing table
After 50 events of 50.

Entry standards
Entry standards and conditions were published in August 2021.

For the entry standards and for the rankings, the valid qualification period was:
 12 months, from 27 July 2021 to 26 July 2022, for all events but the following,
 From 1 January 2021 to 26 July 2022 for each relay teams (16 teams for each event);
 18 months, from 27 January 2021 to 26 July 2022, for the 10,000m, Marathons, 20 km & 35 km Race Walks and Combined Events.

Participating nations
1495 athletes, 713 females and 782 males, from 48 countries, including the Athlete Refugee Team, are expected to participate. As a result of the 2022 Russian invasion of Ukraine, athletes from Russia and Belarus are banned from competing at the 2022 European Championships. No athlete represented Liechtenstein or Monaco in athletics these championships.

References

External links

Home page
European Championships website
EAA Official website

European Championships
2022 in European sport
2022 in German sport
 
European Championships, 2022
Sports competitions in Munich
2022 European Championships
European Athletics Championships
2022